The 1924 Rock Island Independents season was their fifth in the league. The team improved on their previous output of 2–3–3, winning five games. They finished fifth in the league.

Schedule

Standings

References

Rock Island Independents seasons
Rock Island Independents
Rock Island